The Erie Sailors was the primary name of several minor league baseball teams that played in Erie, Pennsylvania between 1906 and 1994.

Pre-1930s
Several unrelated teams used the Erie Sailors name in the Interstate League (1906–1907, 1913, 1916), the Ohio–Pennsylvania League (1908–1911), and the Central League (1912, 1915, 1928–30, 1932).

1938–1963
During these years, the Erie Sailors played in the Middle Atlantic League from 1938–1939, 1941–1942, and 1946–1951; the Pennsylvania–Ontario–New York League (PONY League) from 1944–1945 and 1954–1956; and the PONY's successor New York – Penn League from 1957–1963.  Several times during this period, the team was also called the Erie Senators, after its major league affiliate, the Washington Senators.  The Sailors won league championship in 1957.  The Sailors won the regular season by nine games in 1951.  They then lost the league championship series to the Niagara Falls Citizens, four games to two.

From 1948 onward, this team (and all subsequent Sailors teams) played at Ainsworth Field.

New York–Penn League – 1990s
In 1990, after the Baltimore Orioles ended their affiliation with the team (then known as the Erie Orioles), they reclaimed the Sailors name and operated as an unaffiliated minor league team for two years before becoming the Florida Marlins' first farm team in 1992 and a Texas Rangers affiliate in 1993.  Because of the deteriorating condition of Ainsworth Field, the team moved after the 1993 season to Fishkill, New York and then became the Hudson Valley Renegades.

Frontier League
In 1994, the Sailors were a team in the independent Frontier League, winning the league championship in their only year of existence as a member of the Frontier League.  In 1995, the Erie SeaWolves moved to town, displacing the Sailors, forcing the franchise to move to Johnstown, Pennsylvania as the Johnstown Steal/Johnnies and then to Florence, Kentucky as the Florence Y'alls.

Notable alumni

Hall of Fame Alumni

Chief Bender (1932) Inducted, 1953

Other notable alumni

 Vic Aldridge (1915)

 Luis Alicea (1986)

 Pete Appleton (1951)

 George Bamberger (1946)

 Joe Boever (1982)

 Billy Gilbert (1912)

 Frank Gilhooley (1912)

 Bernard Gilkey (1985)

 Fredi Gonzalez (1992)

 Lance Johnson (1984) MLB All-Star

 Pat Kelly (1962) MLB All-Star

 Paul LaPalme (1942)

 John Lynch (1992)  NFL HOF and current 49ers GM

 Dick McAuliffe (1957) 3 x MLB All-Star

 Cliff Melton (1932) MLB All-Star

 Jim Merritt (1962) MLB All-Star

 Tom Pagnozzi (1983) MLB All-Star

 Frank Quilici (1961)

 Arthur Rhodes (1989) MLB All-Star

 Buck Rodgers (1957) 1987 NL Manager of the Year

 Dean Stone (1951) MLB All-Star

 Bobby Tolan (1988-1989)

 Todd Worrell (1982) 3 x MLB All-Star; 1986 NL Rookie of the Year

 Todd Zeile (1986)

Year-by-year record

Defunct minor league baseball teams
Defunct New York–Penn League teams
Sports in Erie, Pennsylvania
Defunct baseball teams in Pennsylvania
Baltimore Orioles minor league affiliates
Boston Bees minor league affiliates
Cincinnati Reds minor league affiliates
Detroit Tigers minor league affiliates
Miami Marlins minor league affiliates
Minnesota Twins minor league affiliates
New York Giants minor league affiliates
New York Yankees minor league affiliates
St. Louis Cardinals minor league affiliates
Texas Rangers minor league affiliates
Washington Senators minor league affiliates
1905 establishments in Pennsylvania
1994 disestablishments in Pennsylvania
Baseball teams established in 1905
Baseball teams disestablished in 1994
Defunct Frontier League teams
Defunct independent baseball league teams
Central League teams
Middle Atlantic League teams
Ohio-Pennsylvania League teams